Ladysmith is Giles Foden’s second novel. It was published in 1999 by Faber and Faber.

Plot summary

The time is November 1899 through February 1900; the place is Ladysmith, a small railway town in the British Colony of Natal near the border with the Boer Republics. The Boers have surprised the world with initial victories over the British Army and have now laid  siege to Ladysmith. As they shell the town from surrounding hills, people die, disease is rampant, structures collapse, starvation looms, there is panic about enemy agents and yet the British muddle through.

The setting of Giles Foden’s novel is historically accurate, and a number of historical figures appear as characters; for example, the Boers arrest a young reporter named Winston Churchill as he struggles to reach the besieged town, and an Indian lawyer-turned-medical volunteer named Mohandas K. Gandhi becomes  more committed to his philosophy of active non-violence.

The core of Ladysmith is a fictionalised version of a love story that Giles Foden found in the letters of his great-grandfather, who was a British soldier at Ladysmith. Bella, the Irish hotelkeeper's daughter, falls in love, first, with a British soldier; and later with a Portuguese barber, thus defying convention and rebelling against her father.

Release details
 1999, UK, Faber and Faber , Pub date 2 December 1999, paperback
 2000, UK, Faber and Faber , Pub date 3 November 2000, paperback
 2000, UK, Alfred A. Knopf , Pub date ? April 2000, hardback
 2001, USA, Vintage , Pub date ? August 2001, paperback

1999 British novels
Historical novels
Boer Wars
Fiction set in 1899
Fiction set in 1900
Novels set in South Africa
Faber and Faber books